Khristo Tsvetkov (6 March 1934 – 31 January 2018) was a Bulgarian basketball player. He competed in the men's tournament at the 1960 Summer Olympics.

References

External links

1934 births
2018 deaths
Bulgarian men's basketball players
Olympic basketball players of Bulgaria
Basketball players at the 1960 Summer Olympics